The Nizhny Tagil Museum of Regional History is the oldest museum in Nizhny Tagil. The museum belongs to the Nizhny Tagil Museum Reserve "". Furthermore, it is located in the building of the former laboratory outbuilding at the Zavodskaya office. Together with the City Council, it forms the architectural complex called the "Tagil Kremlin".

History 
The Nizhny Tagil Museum of Regional History was originally built in 1840 as the Museum of Natural History and Antiquities. The museum was established on the basis of the exhibition that was organized for Tsesarevich Alexander Nikolaevich, the future Emperor Alexander II, who visited Nizhny Tagil in 1837. The museum was a sheltered institution. Its purpose was to collect, store, and study collections which were also used as a study aid for the students of the Demidov Vyya Technical School.

On the basis of the collections from "Muzeum" and from the Vyya Museum, Metallurgical Museum of the Nizhny Tagil and Lunyevka Factories was established in 1891. However, this museum closed its doors in 1907 due to lack of funding. It caused the loss of many exhibits.

The museum was re-established only in 1924 as the Nizhny Tagil Museum of the Regional History. By the late 1980s, the exhibits devoted to nature were removed, and the museum became the museum of regional history.

Exposure 
In the museum, there are seven exhibit halls. The exposition reflects the history of Nizhny Tagil from ancient times to 1917.

 Hall 1: Primitive communal system from the Palaeolithic age to the early Iron Age. History of the development of the middle Urals in the 16th and 17th centuries.
 Hall 2: History of the field development and occurrence of the first iron and steel works in the 18th century.
 Hall 3: History of the Nizhny Tagil's urban district from 1806 to 1861
 Hall 4: Cultural scene of Nizhny Tagil's urban district in the first half of the 19th century.
 Hall 5: The Demidov family in the history of the Russian culture; their role in the relations between France and Russia, and between Italy and Russia
 Hall 6: Nizhny Tagil's urban district in the second half of the 19th century.
 Hall 7: Nizhny Tagil's urban district in the first half of the 20th century.

References

External links 

 http://museum-nt.ru
 
 

Museums established in 1840
Nizhny Tagil
Local museums in Russia
Museums in Sverdlovsk Oblast
Cultural heritage monuments of federal significance in Sverdlovsk Oblast